This is a list of awards and nominations received by Bii.

2012

2013

2014

2015

2016

2017

References

Bii